Sampeyre is a comune (municipality) in the Province of Cuneo in the Italian region Piedmont, located about  southwest of Turin and about  northwest of Cuneo.

Sampeyre borders the following municipalities: Brossasco, Casteldelfino, Elva, Frassino, Macra, Oncino, Paesana, San Damiano Macra, Sanfront, and Stroppo.

See also
 Baìo

References

External links
 Official website